Célia Šašić (born 27 June 1988) is a German former footballer who played as a striker for SC 07 Bad Neuenahr, 1. FFC Frankfurt and the Germany national team before retiring in 2015.

Club career

Youth career and SC 07 Bad Neuenahr
Šašić began her career at the age of five at TuS Germania Hersel, after her older brother had taken her to a training session. After several clubs at junior level, Šašić joined the Bundesliga side SC 07 Bad Neuenahr in 2004. She quickly became a regular starter and an important player for the club. In 2005, Šašić received the Fritz Walter medal in bronze as the year's third best female junior player. In March 2007, she suffered a fractured tibia in a league game against Bayern Munich, which ended her season. She had been the division's top-scorer up until then.

1. FFC Frankfurt
In June 2013, she signed a three-year contract with 1. FFC Frankfurt. She declined the option for the third year on her contract on 12 May 2015 and became a free agent at the end of the 2014–15 season. On 16 July 2015, she announced her retirement at the age of 27.

International career
Šašić held French citizenship through her mother. After the German Football Association had approached her, she became a German citizen at the beginning of 2004. Later that year, she was part of Germany's winning squad at the 2004 FIFA U-19 Women's World Championship, scoring three goals in the group stage.

In January 2005, Šašić made her debut for Germany's senior national team against Australia. She scored her first goal in a friendly match against Canada in September 2006. A tibia fracture ruled her out for the 2007 FIFA Women's World Cup. She was part of Germany's squads claiming bronze at the 2008 Summer Olympics and winning the title at the 2009 European Championship, where she scored in the semi-final against Norway. At both tournaments, she was a reserve player with limited playing time. Šašić was called up for the German 2011 FIFA Women's World Cup squad. She was part of the victorious German team at UEFA Women's Euro 2013.

She was part of the German team at FIFA Women's World Cup 2015. She scored a hat-trick in Germany's opening game against Ivory Coast on 7 June 2015, and would lead the tournament with six goals, scoring twice against Sweden in a 4-1 victory in the Round of 16, along with a penalty kick goal against France in the quarterfinals. However, she went on to miss a vital penalty kick versus the United States in the semifinals as Germany was eliminated. While Carli Lloyd scored three goals in the final to match Šašić's six and both had one assist, the tiebreaker regarding lesser playtime eventually gave Šašić the Golden Boot as the tournament top scorer. She subsequently announced her retirement from football on 17 July 2015.

Personal life
Šašić was born in Bonn, Germany, the daughter of a Cameroonian father and a French mother. Her family name "da Mbabi" roughly means "(daughter) of Mbabi", while "Okoyino" derives from her father's grandmother. Because of her long name, she was the only women's Bundesliga player with only her first name on her jersey. However, in the national team, her full family name was displayed.

In 2007, Šašić graduated with the Abitur diploma at the Friedrich-Ebert-Gymnasium in Bonn. Her majors were Sports and French. Since October 2009, she began studying Cultural studies at the University of Koblenz and Landau. In August 2013 she married the Croatian football player Marko Šašić, the son of Milan Šašić, and decided to use the name Célia Šašić.

Šašić gave birth to her first child, a daughter, after retiring in 2016.

Career statistics
Scores and results list Germany's goal tally first, score column indicates score after each Šašić goal.

Honours

1. FFC Frankfurt
 DFB-Pokal: 2013–14
 UEFA Women's Champions League: 2014–15

Germany
 UEFA European Championship: 2009, 2013
 Algarve Cup: 2006, 2012, 2014
 Olympic bronze medal: 2008

Germany U20
 U-19 Women's World Championship: 2004

Individual
 German Footballer of the Year: 2012, 2015
 Bundesliga top scorer: 2013–14, 2014–15
 UEFA Women's Champions League: top scorer: 2014–15
 Fritz Walter medal: Bronze 2005
 2015 FIFA Women's World Cup Golden Shoe (top scorer)
 FIFA Women's World Cup All Star Team: 2015
 FIFA Women's World Cup Dream Team: 2015
 UEFA Best Women's Player in Europe Award: 2015 
 FIFPro: FIFA FIFPro World XI 2015
 UEFA Women's Championship All-Star Team: 2013

References

External links
 
 

 Profile  at DFB
 Player German domestic football stats  at DFB
 
 

1988 births
Living people
1. FFC Frankfurt players
2011 FIFA Women's World Cup players
2015 FIFA Women's World Cup players
Women's association football forwards
Footballers at the 2008 Summer Olympics
German people of Cameroonian descent
German people of French descent
German sportspeople of African descent
Naturalized citizens of Germany
German women's footballers
Germany women's international footballers
Medalists at the 2008 Summer Olympics
Olympic bronze medalists for Germany
Olympic footballers of Germany
Olympic medalists in football
SC 07 Bad Neuenahr players
Sportspeople from Bonn
FIFA Century Club
UEFA Women's Championship-winning players
Footballers from North Rhine-Westphalia

Association footballers' wives and girlfriends